The Second Africa-South America Summit took place in September 2009 on Margarita Island, Venezuela, with the participation of Heads of state from 61 countries (49 from Africa and 12 from South America). It aimed to develop South-South Cooperation.

The summit called for a reformation of the UN Security Council, condemned the 2009 Honduran coup d'état and called for the immediate and unconditional reinstatement of President Manuel Zelaya. A Southern equivalent of NATO was also discussed. The summit also approved "a proposal that Venezuela take on the responsibility of organizing the ASA secretariat from now on. The secretariat would meet on Margarita Island and would ensure implementation of the plans and projects coming out of the summit."

The First Africa-South America Summit took place in Nigeria in 2006. The third was scheduled for Libya in 2011, but due to the Libyan Civil War which toppled the government, the third summit was postponed until 2013, when it was held in Malabo, Equatorial Guinea.

See also
 Radio of the South
 Bank of the South
 Global System of Trade Preferences among Developing Countries (GSTP)

References

2009 in Venezuela
Diplomatic conferences in Venezuela
21st-century diplomatic conferences
2009 in international relations